Grace Ballinger (born 3 April 2002) is an English cricketer who currently plays for Leicestershire, The Blaze and London Spirit. She plays as a left-arm medium bowler. She previously played for Warwickshire.

Early life
Ballinger was born on 3 April 2002 in Birmingham. She studies English Literature at Loughborough University.

Domestic career
Ballinger made her county debut in 2018, for Warwickshire against Sussex. She played four matches in the Twenty20 Cup that season, with her best performance coming against Middlesex, in which she took 2/30. The following season, she played two matches as Warwickshire won the 2019 Women's Twenty20 Cup. In 2021, it was announced that Ballinger had signed for Leicestershire. She played five matches for the side in the Twenty20 Cup that season, scoring 71 runs and taking 2 wickets. In the 2022 Women's Twenty20 Cup, she was Leicestershire's leading run-scorer and leading wicket-taker, with 156 runs and 10 wickets. She scored two half-centuries, against Lincolnshire and Northamptonshire, as well as taking her Twenty20 best bowling figures of 3/6, also against Lincolnshire.

In 2020, Ballinger played for Lightning in the Rachael Heyhoe Flint Trophy. She appeared in three matches, scoring 5 runs and bowling 11 overs for no wicket. In 2021, she took seven wickets for the side across the Rachael Heyhoe Flint Trophy and the Charlotte Edwards Cup. She played ten matches for the side in 2022, across the Charlotte Edwards Cup and the Rachael Heyhoe Flint Trophy, and took nine wickets at an average of 17.77 in the Rachael Heyhoe Flint Trophy. Against North West Thunder in the Rachael Heyhoe Flint Trophy, Ballinger took her maiden five-wicket haul, returning figures of 5/29. She also played two matches for London Spirit in The Hundred. In February 2023, it was announced that Ballinger had signed her first professional contract with Lightning, now known as The Blaze.

References

External links

2002 births
Living people
Cricketers from Birmingham, West Midlands
Warwickshire women cricketers
Leicestershire women cricketers
The Blaze women's cricketers
London Spirit cricketers